Tethi Bari is a village, in Bhagabanpur I CD Block in Egra subdivision of Purba Medinipur district in the state of West Bengal, India.

Geography

Location

Urbanisation
96.96% of the population of Egra subdivision live in the rural areas. Only 3.04% of the population live in the urban areas, and that is the lowest proportion of urban population amongst the four subdivisions in Purba Medinipur district.

Note: The map alongside presents some of the notable locations in the subdivision. All places marked in the map are linked in the larger full screen map.

Demographics
As per 2011 Census of India Tethi Bari had a total population of 2,420 of which 1,259 (52%) were males and 1,161 (48%) were females. Population below 6 years was 268. The total number of literates in Tethi Bari was 2,022 (93.96 % of the population over 6 years).

Transport
Deshapran railway station, located nearby, is on the Tamluk-Digha line, constructed in 2003-04.

Education
Bajkul Milani Mahavidyalaya was established at Tethibari mouza, PO Kismat Bajkul, in 1964. It is affiliated to Vidyasagar University.

Healthcare
There is primary health centres at Kajlagarh (with 6 beds).

References

Villages in Purba Medinipur district